Evolutionist Liberal Party was a political party in the Dominican Republic, founded by Fernando Amiama Tió.

At the time of the April 1965 war, the general secretary of the PLE, Héctor Aristy, joined rebel forces demanding the replacement of the Juan Bosch cabinet and upheld the progressive 1963 Constitution.

In the 1966 elections the party obtained 6,540 votes (0.49%).

References

Defunct political parties in the Dominican Republic
Defunct liberal political parties
Liberal parties in North America